Jorge Antonio Zabaleta Briceño  (born April 18, 1970 in Santiago) is a Chilean actor. He is the son of the musician Antonio Zabaleta and the nephew of Miguel Zabaleta, both members of the duo Red Juniors.

Jorge worked in Canal 13 until 2008, when he joined TVN working in Hijos del Monte.

Filmography
Television

External links
 

1970 births
Living people
Male actors from Santiago
Chilean people of Basque descent
Chilean male film actors
Chilean male telenovela actors
Chilean male television actors
Chilean television presenters
Chilean television personalities